Umashankar Gupta is an Indian politician that formerly served as Minister of Revenue and Science & Technology in the BJP-led Government of Madhya Pradesh from 2013 to 2018. He lost in the 2018 Madhya Pradesh Legislative Assembly Elections to Congress leader P. C. Sharma.

References

Living people
State cabinet ministers of Madhya Pradesh
1952 births
People from Sagar district
Bharatiya Janata Party politicians from Madhya Pradesh
Madhya Pradesh MLAs 2003–2008
Madhya Pradesh MLAs 2008–2013
Madhya Pradesh MLAs 2013–2018